This is a list of South American countries by GDP (nominal) per capita per the International Monetary Fund.

See also
 List of South American countries by GDP (PPP) per capita

References

 GDP (nominal) per capita